Love Among the Cannibals is the third album released in 1989 by rock band Starship. It was the first album after Grace Slick's departure from the band, and their last full-length studio release until Loveless Fascination in 2013. The album marks a shift in the band's musical direction, featuring a harder edged, AOR style as opposed to the synth pop of their first two albums. Another departure from the preceding albums is the decrease in outside writers, as this album features four songs written by Thomas, Morgan, or Chaquico. The song "Wild Again" had previously been produced for the soundtrack to Cocktail (1988), and was included as a bonus track for the album's CD release. The album had one top 20 single on the Billboard charts, "It's Not Enough", which peaked at No. 12 in October 1989 and was their final Top-40 hit, but the album itself only climbed to No. 64. The track "I'll Be There" went on to being featured in the end credits of Gross Anatomy (1989).

Critical reception
In the review of 7 October 1989 the author of Music Week Andrew Martin said that the music of the album had no connection with previous incarnations of the group (Jefferson Airplane and Jefferson Starship) but noted that it is still full of "pleasant tunes".

Track listing

Singles
"Wild Again" (1988) (single only / no video)
"It's Not Enough" (1989)
"I Didn't Mean to Stay All Night" (1989)
"I'll Be There" (1989) (single only / no video)

Personnel
Mickey Thomas – vocals
Craig Chaquico – guitars
Donny Baldwin – drums, backing vocals
Mark Morgan – keyboards
Brett Bloomfield – bass, backing vocals

Additional Personnel

Pete Woodroffe – electronics on "The Burn"
Michael Landau – additional rhythm guitar on "The Burn"
Tommy Funderburk – additional backing vocal on "The Burn", "It's Not Enough" and "I Didn't Mean to Stay All Night"
Larry Klein – Fairlight programming on "It's Not Enough" and "I Didn't Mean to Stay All Night"
Collyer Spreen – electronics on "Trouble In Mind", "Send a Message", "Healing Waters" and "Blaze of Love"
Robert John "Mutt" Lange – backing vocals on "I Didn't Mean to Stay All Night"
Sammy Merendino – electronics on "Wild Again"
Chris Thompson – additional backing vocals on "Wild Again"
Jeff Pescetto – additional backing vocals on "Wild Again"
Greg Shaw – electronics and trumpet on "Love Among the Cannibals", Synclavier on "Love Among the Cannibals" and "We Dream In Color"
Tom Lord-Alge – additional backing vocal on "Healing Waters"

Production
Starship – producer on "Trouble in Mind", "Send a Message", "Wild Again", "Love Among the Cannibals", "We Dream In Color", "Healing Waters", "Blaze of Love" and "I'll Be There"
Mike Shipley – producer, engineer, mixer on "The Burn", "It's Not Enough" and "I Didn't Mean to Stay All Night"; mixer on "Wild Again"
Larry Klein – producer on "It's Not Enough" and "I Didn't Mean to Stay All Night"; arranger on "The Burn" and "It's Not Enough"
Tom Lord-Alge – producer, engineer, mixer on "Trouble In Mind", "Send a Message", "Healing Waters", "Blaze of Love" and "I'll Be There"
Phil Galdston – producer on "Wild Again"
Arne Frager – co-producer, engineer on "Love Among the Cannibals" and "We Dream In Color"
Robert John "Mutt" Lange – arranger on "I Didn't Mean to Stay All Night"
Stephan Benben – engineer on "Wild Again"
Paul Lani – mixer on "Love Among the Cannibals" and "We Dream In Color"
Pete Woodroffe – additional engineering on "The Burn"
Greg Laney – assistant engineer on "The Burn"
Rob Beaton – assistant engineer on "The Burn"; additional engineering on "Love Among the Cannibals" and "We Dream In Color"
Mark Slagle – assistant engineer on "The Burn", "Trouble In Mind", "Send a Message", "Healing Waters", "Blaze of Love" and "I'll Be There"
Julie Last – assistant engineer on "It's Not Enough"
Randy Wine – assistant engineer on "Trouble In Mind"
Tom Sadzeck – assistant engineer on "Trouble In Mind", "Healing Waters" and "Blaze of Love"
Michael Semanick – assistant engineer on "Trouble In Mind", "Send a Message", "Healing Waters", "Blaze of Love" and "I'll Be There"
Tony Phillips – additional engineering on "I Didn't Mean to Stay All Night"
Greg Wilkinson – assistant engineer on "I Didn't Mean to Stay All Night"
Paula "Max" Garcia – assistant engineer on "I Didn't Mean to Stay All Night"
Jim "Watts" Vereecke – assistant engineer on "Wild Again"
Tom Size – assistant engineer on "Wild Again"
Joe Fiorello – assistant re-mix engineer on "Wild Again"
Michael Rosen – assistant engineer on "Wild Again"
Mastered by Greg Fulginiti at Artisan Sound Recorders
Bill Thompson – manager
Bill Laudner – tour manager
Geoff Grace – guitar tech
Linda Lalli – office manager, assistant to manager
Stephen M. Coats – controller
Ralph Pavoni – production manager
Collyer Spreen – keyboard tech
Sue Pemberton – administrative and publicity assistant
Ria Lewerke – creative director
Norman Moore – design & art direction
Taylor King – photography
Lisa Avila Baldwin – make-up

Studios

Recording
"The Burn" recorded at Studio 55, Hollywood, The Plant Recording Studios, Sausalito, and Different Fur, San Francisco
"It's Not Enough" recorded at The Kiva, Los Angeles and Soundcastle, Los Angeles
"Trouble In Mind", "Healing Waters", and "Blaze of Love" recorded at The Plant Recording Studios, Sausalito, Different Fur, San Francisco, and Fantasy Studios, Berkeley
"I Didn't Mean to Stay All Night" recorded at The Kiva, Los Angeles and Maison Rouge, London
"Send a Message" and "I'll Be There" recorded at Fantasy Studios, Berkeley and Different Fur, San Francisco
"Wild Again" recorded at Studio D, Sausalito and Fantasy Studios, Berkeley
"Love Among the Cannibals" and "We Dream In Color" recorded at The Plant Recording Studios, Sausalito

Mixing
"The Burn" mixed at Mayfair Studios, London
"It's Not Enough" mixed at A&M Recording Studios, Los Angeles
"Trouble In Mind" and "I'll Be There" mixed at The Hit Factory, New York City
"Send a Message", "Healing Waters" and "Blaze of Love" mixed at Different Fur, San Francisco
"I Didn't Mean to Stay All Night" mixed at Battery Studios, London
"Wild Again" mixed at Soundcastle, Los Angeles
"Love Among the Cannibals" and "We Dream In Color" mixed at Larrabee Sound, Los Angeles

Charts
Album

Singles

References

1989 albums
Albums produced by Larry Klein
Albums produced by Mike Shipley
Albums produced by Tom Lord-Alge
RCA Records albums
Starship (band) albums